The Ghost Who Walks is a 2019 American action film directed by Cody Stokes. The film premiered on July 21, 2019 at the St. Louis Filmmakers Showcase.

Plot 
A man who has provided information to the authorities in exchange for an early release from prison seeks to stay one step ahead of vengeful gangsters while trying to reconnect with his former girlfriend and the daughter he has never met over the Christmas holidays.

Production 
The Ghost Who Walks was filmed in St. Louis in neighborhoods such as Dogtown, Soulard, and the Central West End. Shopping scenes were filmed at Chesterfield Mall in the suburb of Chesterfield, Missouri.

Cast 

 Garland Scott as Nolan
 Frank Mosley as Stitches
 Alexia Rasmussen as Lena
 Gil Darnell as Donnie
 Dasha Nekrasova as Mitzie
 Nattalyee Randall as Tanya
 Linda Kennedy as Dunya
 Peter Mayer as Monty

Reception and recognition 
Alex Saveliev of Film Threat wrote that "the end result doesn’t quite hold together." Dan Buffa of KMOV called it a "thrilling ride" but criticized the film for being slow.

The Ghost Who Walks won awards for Best Narrative Feature over 20 Minutes, Best Makeup/Hairstyling, Best Actor, Best Supporting Actor, and Best Supporting Actress at the St. Louis International Film Festival. It was also screened at Sidewalk Film Festival.

It streamed on Netflix in 2020 and was Netflix's eighth most-streamed movie in the United States around April 16, 2020.

References

External links 
 
 

2019 action films
2019 films
Films shot in St. Louis
2010s English-language films